St Sebastian is an oil on penal painting by Perugino, executed c. 1490. The painting has been in the Nationalmuseum in Stockholm since 1928. It is one of the artist's earliest depictions of Saint Sebastian, showing him as an ephebos, or male adolescent, unlike his later treatments based on the Doryphoros, such as that in the  Louvre. It is signed "Petrus Perusinus pinxit" (Peter of Perugia painted [it]).

References

Paintings by Pietro Perugino
1490 paintings
Paintings in the collection of the Nationalmuseum Stockholm
Perugino